The Brazilian Volleyball Confederation is the governing body of volleyball and beach volleyball in Brazil. Formed in 1954, its headquarters are in Barra da Tijuca, Rio de Janeiro. The CBV is a member of the International Volleyball Federation (FIVB) and the South American Volleyball Confederation (CSV) and it is affiliated to the Brazilian Olympic Committee. It organizes both the men's and women's Brazilian Volleyball Superleague, which are the top level's volleyball competition in Brazil, and also organizes the Salonpas Cup, which is an international women's club cup competition played annually in Brazil. The organization also administrates the Brazil men's national volleyball team and the Brazil women's national volleyball team.

Tournaments
 Brazilian Volleyball Superleague
 Brazilian Volleyball Cup
 Brazilian Volleyball Supercopa

Presidents
Below is a list of all CBV presidents:

Affiliated state federations
All the Brazilian state federations are affiliated to the CBV:

References
 Confederação Brasileira de Voleibol official website

External links
 Confederação Brasileira de Voleibol official website

 
Volleyball
Brazil